Mahmoud Mohamed Taher Shabana (born 6 April 1995) is an Egyptian professional footballer who plays as a centre-back for Egyptian Premier League club Zamalek.

References

External links
 

Living people
1995 births
Egyptian footballers
Zamalek SC players
Association football central defenders